The Badger Creek Fire is a wildfire that started in the summer of 2018 in the Medicine Bow National Forest, about 2 miles northwest of the community of Mountain Home, Albany County Wyoming, near the Colorado border, United States.

Timeline

June 13
The fire involves around 2,300 acres.

June 14
The fire had expanded to 5,244 acres by June 14.

June 16
By June 16, it had expanded to over 19,000 acres and was 0% contained.

Nearly 400 homes were evacuated. The communities of Mountain Home, Wold Tract, Wyocolo, Miller Lake, Beehive, Gramm, Woods Landing, Fox Park and various other homes have received orders to evacuate.

June 17
Although expanded to around 20,088 acres, on June 17 the fire was 62% contained.

June 20
The fire was nearly completely contained. Evacuated residents were permitted to return home. Wyoming Highway 230 was reopened. There were four burglaries in the evacuated communities, discovered by residents upon their return. The area remains hazardous due to fire-weakened trees that could fall, as well as the danger from ash pits.

Cause
The cause remains unknown and is under investigation. However, on June 20, it was reported that a preliminary investigation had located the origin and that humans appear to have been the cause.

References

External links
Current status at InciWeb
Satellite image from NASA

Wildfires in Wyoming
2018 wildfires in the United States
2018 in Wyoming